St. John the Baptist Catholic Church is a historic church on FM 1383 in Ammannsville, Texas.
It was built in 1917 and added to the National Register of Historic Places in 1983.

See also

National Register of Historic Places listings in Fayette County, Texas

References

External links

Churches in Fayette County, Texas
Roman Catholic churches in Texas
Roman Catholic churches completed in 1917
Churches on the National Register of Historic Places in Texas
Carpenter Gothic church buildings in Texas
National Register of Historic Places in Fayette County, Texas
20th-century Roman Catholic church buildings in the United States